Ekaterina Sysoeva (born 3 June 1981) is a former professional Russian tennis player.

In her career, Sysoeva won one doubles title on the WTA Tour, as well as three singles and ten doubles titles on the ITF Women's Circuit. She reached her career-high singles rank of world No. 178 on 12 August 2002. Her career-high in doubles is 87th, set on 14 October 2002.

Playing for Russia at the Fed Cup, Sysoeva has a win–loss 1–3.

WTA career finals

Doubles: 3 (1 titles, 2 runner-ups)

ITF finals

Singles (3–9)

Doubles (10–8)

References

External links
 
 
 

1981 births
Living people
Tennis players from Moscow
Russian female tennis players
20th-century Russian women
21st-century Russian women